Assault is a 1983 fixed shooter video game developed and published by Bomb for the Atari 2600. Controlling a spaceship fixated at the bottom of the screen, gameplay involves the player shooting projectiles towards an enemy mothership that deploys smaller ships to attack the player. The player must also prevent enough projectiles from touching the bottom of the screen.

Assault was produced by Bomb, a video game developer based out of Asia. It received lukewarm reviews from critics upon release, many referring to it as a rip-off of games such as Galaxian and Demon Attack and criticizing its graphics. Some reviewers did state that despite being unoriginal, was still fun to play, labeling it one of Bomb's better releases for the 2600.

Gameplay

The player is presented with an alien mother ship, which continually deploys three smaller ships during play. The mother ship and the smaller vessels shoot at a weapon the player is in command of, and the player's aim is to eliminate the opposition while preventing the weapon from receiving enough fire to destroy it.  The player uses a joystick to operate the game, and only one player at a time can play.

Reception
On release the game was positively reviewed by TV Gamer magazine, which described it as "all in all, a very good game" and as the best Bomb game. Computer and Video Games magazine also gave the game a positive review, praising particularly the fact that the game allowed both shooting directly up the screen as well as to left and right. The German computing magazine TeleMatch gave this game 3/6 in its August/September 1983 edition, indicating a middling score. Videogaming Illustrated described it as "Demon Attack revisited".

Critical reaction to the game by non-contemporary reviewers been mixed. Keita Iida, marked the game as unoriginal, concluded that the gameplay is unimaginative, and described the graphics as "drab visuals".  He also said that Assault is a rip-off of Galaxian.  However, Iida opined that the game is better than some other Bomb products. "Classic Video Game Reviews"  gave the game a B+ grade, saying that it is a "little gem," noting that though he did feel it is a rip-off of Phoenix or Demon Attack, it is fun and employs a good colour scheme. In Classic Home Video Games, 1972-1984: A Complete Reference Guide this game is described as "repetitious, though fairly entertaining".

References

1983 video games
Atari 2600 games
Atari 2600-only games
Fixed shooters
Video games developed in Japan